Torso is a 1973 Italian giallo film directed by Sergio Martino. It may be considered the first slasher film ever made.

Plot
In Perugia, the murder of several university students leads to a manhunt for a masked killer with a psychosexual disorder who uses red-and-black foulards to strangle his female victims before mutilating their bodies. When a wealthy student named Dani vaguely recalls having seen someone wearing such a scarf, she becomes the target of the mystery killer and, at her philandering uncle's suggestion, invites three of her girlfriends (two of them, lipstick lesbians) to stay with her at her family's remote country villa in Tagliacozzo.

However, the isolated cliffside villa offers no protection from the killer, who has meanwhile run over the blackmailing street vendor he buys his scarves from. A local peeping tom and then Dani's impotent stalker (who wears a similar red-and-black scarf to the killer's) go up to the villa, only to be ruthlessly killed too. One of the girls, Jane, sprains her ankle and a local doctor gives her a sedative; as such, she is asleep when the killer forces his way into the villa and kills her three girlfriends. Jane wakes up the next day only to silently witness the unidentified killer dismember her friends' bodies. Having disposed of the corpses, the killer locks up the villa and departs, inadvertently leaving the injured Jane trapped inside. Later on, having realized that Jane is alive in the villa, the killer silently returns and reveals himself to her.

The killer is Franz, an art history lecturer whom Jane had befriended. He is a psychopathic misogynist as a result of a childhood trauma when he witnessed his brother fall to his death as he was trying to fetch a little girl's doll at a cliff's edge. Franz tells Jane that his first two victims (whom he calls "filthy bitches" and "dolls made out of flesh and blood") had seduced him into a threesome and then blackmailed him. He had continued his killing spree in order to cover his tracks. As Franz attempts to murder Jane to ensure he is never caught, the doctor shows up and, after a struggle, Franz falls to his death.

Cast

 Suzy Kendall as Jane
 Tina Aumont as Dani (Daniela)
 Luc Merenda as Roberto
 John Richardson as Franz
 Roberto Bisacco as Stefano Vanzi
 Ernesto Colli as	Gianni Tomasso, the street vendor
  as Katia
  as Ursula
 Conchita Airoldi as Carol Peterson
 Patrizia Adiutori as Flo (Florence) Heineken
 Luciano Bartoli as Peter
 Gianni Greco as George
 Luciano De Ambrosis as Inspector Martino
 Carlo Alighiero as Uncle Nino

Release
The film was released with its original title in Italy on January 4, 1973. Joseph Brenner Associates later distributed a recut and rescored dubbed version as Torso in the US and the film became a success there on the drive-in and grindhouse circuits, often as a double feature with The Texas Chain Saw Massacre (1974).

The film was released on DVD in the US by Anchor Bay Entertainment in 2000 and in the UK by Shameless in 2007. It has since had Blu-ray releases by Blue Underground in 2011, Shameless in 2017 and Arrow Video in 2018.

Critical response 
George Anderson of the Pittsburgh Post-Gazette deemed the film "another display of softcore sex and seamy violence that might better have been kept abroad." Joe Baltake of the Philadelphia Daily News wrote: "Blood flows freely and limbs detach easily, in Sergio Martino's Torso, a disagreeable Italian import withnot surprisinglylittle to recommend it." The Los Angeles Timess Linda Gross wrote that the film was a "lazy suspense movie" with a "disjointed and loose" screenplay.

The extended cat-and-mouse villa scenes between the killer and the final girl in the film's last 30 minutes have led to Torso being retrospectively recognised as a "proto-slasher film". Quentin Tarantino showed his print of the film at the 1999 QT-Fest and fellow filmmaker Eli Roth has cited the film among his favourite gialli and an influence on Grindhouse and Hostel: Part II (both 2007).

PopMatters gave it a 7 out of 10 rating, while Slant Magazine said it "pales next to director Sergio Martino's more inventive sleaze-thrillers (The Strange Vice of Mrs. Wardh, All the Colors of the Dark)".

In their 2017 article, Complex named Torso the 6th best slasher film of all time.

See also
 List of films featuring home invasions
 List of Italian films of 1973

References

External links
 
 
 

1973 films
1970s Italian-language films
1970s crime thriller films
Giallo films
Films directed by Sergio Martino
Italian serial killer films
Italian thriller films
Italian LGBT-related films
Home invasions in film
LGBT-related horror films
Films set in Italy
Films set in Abruzzo
Films set in country houses
Films scored by Guido & Maurizio De Angelis
Films shot in Abruzzo
Films with screenplays by Ernesto Gastaldi
Italian slasher films
1973 LGBT-related films
1970s slasher films
Backwoods slasher films
Italian exploitation films
1970s Italian films